Isaak James Davies (born 25 September 2001) is a Welsh footballer who plays for Cardiff City, as a forward.

Club career
Davies signed for Cardiff City at the age of 7. He signed his first professional contract in February 2021, alongside Rubin Colwill. He made his first-team debut for Cardiff City on 23 October 2021 against Middlesbrough. He assisted Kieffer Moore in Cardiff City's 2–1 win over Huddersfield Town on 6 November 2021.  Davies scored his first senior goal on 9 January 2022, scoring the first in Cardiff's 2–1 FA Cup victory over Preston North End.

International career
He represented Wales at youth international level.

Career statistics

References

2001 births
Living people
Welsh footballers
Wales youth international footballers
Wales under-21 international footballers
Cardiff City F.C. players
English Football League players
Association football forwards